Čiurlionis is a Lithuanian-language surname. Notable people with this surname include:

Mikalojus Konstantinas Čiurlionis (1875-1911), Lithuanian painter, composer and writer
Sofija Kymantaitė-Čiurlionienė (1886 - 1958), Lithuanian writer, activist, literary and art critic, playwright, poet, and translator
 (1910-1995), Lithuanian writer and translator, Righteous among the Nations

Lithuanian-language surnames